Nomansland is a small village in Wiltshire, England, close to the county border with Hampshire. The village is within the boundaries of the New Forest National Park and is close to Pipers Wait, the highest point in the New Forest.

In the early 19th century the settlement was a hamlet, no more than a group of cottages on common land. At first part of Downton parish, by 1841 Nomansland had been excluded from the parish and was deemed an extra-parochial place, then in 1857 became a civil parish which was joined to Redlynch parish in 1934. More houses were built in the later 19th century and the 20th century. A community governance review effective 1 April 2017 transferred the eastern portion of Redlynch parish, including Nomansland, to Landford.

The local school is the New Forest Primary School which has two sites: for younger children at Landford and older children at Nomansland. The latter began as a National School of 1867 on Hamptworth common, then in the 20th century the village of Nomansland expanded to surround it.

A Primitive Methodist chapel was built in the mid-19th century and replaced by a new building on the green in 1901. This became Nomansland Methodist Chapel and was still in use in 2015.

The village has a pub, the Lamb Inn, and a French restaurant, Les Mirabelles.

References

External links

Villages in Wiltshire